In organic chemistry an enol ether is an alkene with an alkoxy substituent. The general structure is R2C=CR-OR where R = H, alkyl or aryl. A common subfamily of enol ethers are vinyl ethers, with the formula ROCH=CH2. Important enol ethers include the reagent 3,4-dihydropyran and the monomers methyl vinyl ether and ethyl vinyl ether.

Reactions and uses
Akin to enamines, enol ethers are electron-rich alkenes by virtue of the electron-donation from the heteroatom via pi-bonding. Enol ethers have oxonium ion character. By virtue of their bonding situation, enol ethers display distinctive reactivity. In comparison with simple alkenes, enol ethers exhibit enhanced susceptibility to attack by electrophiles such as Bronsted acids. Similarly, they undergo inverse demand Diels-Alder reactions.

The reactivity of enol ethers is highly dependent on the presence of substituents alpha to oxygen. The vinyl ethers are susceptible to polymerization to give polyvinyl ethers. Some vinyl ethers also find some use as inhalation anesthetics. Enol ethers bearing α substituents do not polymerize readily. They are mainly of academic interest, e.g. as intermediates in the synthesis of more complex molecules.

The acid-catalyzed addition of hydrogen peroxide to vinyl ethers gives the hydroperoxide:
C2H5OCH=CH2  +  H2O2  →  C2H5OCH(OOH)CH3

Preparation
Although enol ethers can be considered the ether of the corresponding enolates, they are not prepared by alkylation of enolates. Some enol ethers are prepared from saturated ethers by elimination reactions.

Alternatively, vinyl ethers can be prepared from alcohols by iridium-catalyzed transesterification of vinyl esters, especially the widely available vinyl acetate:
ROH + CH2=CHOAc → ROCH=CH2 + HOAc

Vinyl ethers can be prepared by reaction of acetylene and alcohols in presence of a base.

Occurrence in nature
The enzyme chorismate mutase catalyzes the Claisen rearrangement of the enol ether called chorismate to prephenate, an intermediate in the biosynthesis of phenylalanine and tyrosine.

See also
Silyl enol ether

References

Functional groups